Jesus "Txus" Gómez Vidorreta (born 20 June 1966) is a Spanish professional basketball coach. Vidorreta, born in Bilbao, has coached several teams in Spain.

He has been most successful as the head coach of Canarias, he has won two Basketball Champions League titles, in 2017 and 2022, as well as one FIBA Intercontinental Cup title in 2023.

Coaching career
After winning a league promotion to the Spanish top-tier level, the Liga ACB, with Cajabilbao in 1994, Vidorreta continued managing teams in the Spanish lower divisions.

In 2001, he was appointed as the head coach of the newly created Bilbao Basket, which started playing in the LEB Plata, the Spanish third tier league, at the time. With the Basque club, Vidorreta won two league promotions in three seasons, and made his debut as a head coach in the Liga ACB in 2004. He continued there for six more seasons, until being sacked in January 2010.

Vidorreta then worked as a head coach of several different ACB teams, such as Lucentum Alicante, Estudiantes, and Canarias, where he arrived in November 2015.

In April 2017, Vidorreta won his first European-wide continental title, by winning the championship of the European third-level Champions League 2016–17 season. Vidorreta was the first coach to win this newly established continental league.

On 20 June 2017, Vidorreta was announced as the new head coach of the reigning Spanish League champion, Valencia Basket. With Valencia, Vidorreta coached in the EuroLeague, where the team had a 12–18 record. In the ACB season, Valencia was eliminated in the quarterfinals of the playoffs by Herbalife Gran Canaria. On June 8, 2018, Valencia Basket announced Vidorreta and the club parted ways.

On 11 June 2018, Vidorreta returned to Iberostar Tenerife as he signed a 3-year contract with the club. He had his contract extended by two years on May 20, 2020. On May 8, 2022, Vidorreta won his second Champions League title after his team defeated Manresa in the final of the Final Four in Bilbao.

On 12 February 2023, he won the 2023 FIBA Intercontinental Cup with Canarias after defeating Monastir in the semi-finals and São Paulo in the final.

Coaching record

EuroLeague

|- 
| align="left"|Valencia
| align="left"|2017–18
| 30 || 12 || 18 ||  || align="center"|Eliminated in regular season
|-class="sortbottom"
| align="center" colspan=2|Career||30||12||18||||

Honours and awards

Club
Canarias
FIBA Intercontinental Cup: (2023) 
2× Basketball Champions League: (2017, 2022)

Individual
LEB 2 Coach of the Season: (2002)
LEB Coach of the Season: (2004)
ACB Best Coach: (2017)

References

External links
 Txus Vidorreta at acb.com 
 Txus Vidorreta at euroleague.net

1966 births
Living people
CB 1939 Canarias coaches
CB Estudiantes coaches
Liga ACB head coaches
People from Bilbao
Spanish basketball coaches